Turbulent Indigo is the 15th album by Canadian singer-songwriter Joni Mitchell. Released in 1994, it won a Grammy Award for Best Pop Album. John Milward, writing for Rolling Stone, wrote that it was Mitchell's "best album since the mid-'70s".

The album marked her return to Warner Music (formerly WEA) distribution after her previous album, Night Ride Home, was distributed by MCA for its then-newly purchased subsidiary Geffen Records (which, prior to the sale to MCA, had distributed through WEA).

The album takes inspiration from the Dutch artist Vincent van Gogh for Mitchell's self-portrait on the cover. The song "Turbulent Indigo" references van Gogh, while describing the mental turmoil both he and Mitchell face in the creative process. Mitchell goes on to outline irrational feelings of intense rage and jealousy in the track "Borderline". The song "Not to Blame" was rumored to be about Mitchell's fellow singer-songwriter and former lover Jackson Browne, who was alleged to have beaten his girlfriend, actress Daryl Hannah.

Mitchell also takes in non-personal issues, notably in the song "Magdalene Laundries", which recounts the sufferings of Irish women once consigned to Magdalen Asylums run by the Roman Catholic Church and made to work in the asylums' laundries. Similarly, the song "Sex Kills" referenced a number of late 20th century topical issues, including violence, AIDS, global warming and consumerism.

, the album has sold 311,000 copies in the US.

Critical reception
Turbulent Indigo received critical acclaim. Qs Tom Doyle called the album a "welcome return to the atmospherics and acoustic terrain she's best known for", further writing that "The majority of the tracks here recall the wafting soundscapes of 1976's Hejira, with gentle, controlled feedback, Pastorius-styled bass, Wayne Shorter's tumbling saxophone patterns and walls of acoustic guitars providing a dramatic backdrop for Mitchell's bold lyrical imagery."

Track listing
All tracks composed by Joni Mitchell; except where indicated

"Sunny Sunday" – 2:21
"Sex Kills" – 3:56
"How Do You Stop" (Charlie Midnight, Dan Hartman) – 4:09
"Turbulent Indigo" – 3:34
"Last Chance Lost" – 3:14
"The Magdalene Laundries" – 4:02
"Not to Blame" – 4:18
"Borderline" – 4:48
"Yvette in English" (Mitchell, David Crosby) – 5:16
"The Sire of Sorrow (Job's Sad Song)" – 7:08

Personnel
 Joni Mitchell – vocals, guitar, keyboards
 Larry Klein – organ, bass
 Wayne Shorter – soprano saxophone on tracks: 1, 4, 7, 9, 10
 Jim Keltner – drums on "Sunny Sunday"
 Carlos Vega – drums on tracks: 3, 4, 7
 Michael Landau – electric guitar on tracks: 2, 3
 Greg Leisz – pedal steel guitar on tracks: 7, 8
 Steuart Smith – guitar on "How Do You Stop"
 Seal – vocals on "How Do You Stop"
 Bill Dillon – synthesizer on "Yvette in English"
 Charles Valentino – backing vocals on "Yvette in English"
 Kris Kello – backing vocals on "Yvette in English"

Charts

References

Joni Mitchell albums
1994 albums
Albums produced by Larry Klein
Asylum Records albums
Grammy Award for Best Pop Vocal Album
Albums with cover art by Joni Mitchell